Kottupullampalayam is a panchayat village in Gobichettipalayam taluk in Erode District of Tamil Nadu state, India. The village is located on the road connecting Gobichettipalayam with Sathyamangalam. Kottupullampalayam has a population of about 6197.

References

Villages in Erode district